Rohatgi is a surname of Indian origin. People with this surname include:

 Mukul Rohatgi, 14th Attorney General of India
 Payal Rohatgi (born 1984), Indian actress and reality TV performer
 Pradeep Rohatgi (born 1943), Indian-American materials scientist
 Roger Rohatgi, American independent film producer and screenwriter
 Sushila Rohatgi (1921–2011), Indian politician

See also 
 22958 Rohatgi, a main-belt asteroid named after Abhinav Rohatgi, awardee in the Intel Science Talent Search
 J L Rohatgi Memorial Eye Hospital in Kanpur, India

Indian surnames